The Sura (Săr) is a river in Russia, a north-flowing right tributary of the Volga. Its mouth on the Volga is about half way between Nizhny Novgorod and Kazan. It flows through Penza Oblast, Mordovia, Ulyanovsk Oblast, Chuvashia and Nizhny Novgorod Oblast. It is navigable for 394 km from the mouth.

The city of Penza, and smaller towns Alatyr, Shumerlya, Yadrin lie along the Sura. At the confluence with the Volga there is a settlement of Vasilsursk.

The principal affluents of the Sura are the Penza, the Pyana, and the Alatyr.

References

External links 
 
 
 
 
 
 
 

Sura is an epithet of the gods in Sanskrit, as well as a divine drink. In addition, Sura is the Hindu goddess of wine.
The exact translation from Sanskrit is "God". "Su" - "having power", "Ra" - "The Supreme Lord". "Suras" - "having power from the Supreme Lord"
Sura - so named two rivers, in the area of Simbirsk and in the basin of the Northern Dvina and two cities in the Arkhangelsk and Penza regions have such names.

Rivers of Chuvashia
Rivers of Mordovia
Rivers of Nizhny Novgorod Oblast
Rivers of Penza Oblast
Rivers of Ulyanovsk Oblast